Fourth Monkey Actor Training Company (formerly named Fourth Monkey Theatre Company) is both a repertory theatre company, and an actor training provider and drama school for young actors.

Based in North London, United Kingdom, Fourth Monkey provides an alternative to traditional conservatoire training or drama school. In addition to receiving training in London, Fourth Monkey's actors travel and perform throughout the UK and overseas in a repertory style.

Alongside Fourth Monkey's approach to training, the company is noted for their theatre productions. Although performing in a wide range of theatrical styles and genres, they are generally recognised for their work in repertory theatre, ensemble theatre, physical theatre, in-yer-face theatre, site-specific theatre, and fringe theatre.

Overview

Fourth Monkey (the name is a variation on the three wise monkeys pictorial maxim) was formed by Steven Green, the company's Artistic Director. His intention was to create a hands-on alternative to drama school training.

Initially only a one-year course ("The Year of the Monkey") the company, in 2012, began providing a two-year programme ("Two Year Rep") as well. Some actors train at Fourth Monkey for three years, graduating from the one-year programme onto the two-year. The company also offers a variety of Short Courses & Intensive Programmes.

The Fourth Monkey Ensemble is the professional touring arm of the company. Born out of the training programme, the company's aim is to deliver original, physical theatre nationally and internationally. The Ensemble toured in 2014 - 2015 with their acclaimed OFFIE nominated production of The Elephant Man, which was supported by Arts Council England.

Fourth Monkey performed annually at the Edinburgh Festival Fringe (from 2010 - 2018), where they earned a following. The company has since shifted their focus towards partaking in the Camden Fringe, performing annually at the festival since 2017.

The company is also noted for having actors (on the Two Year Rep course) spend a month-long residency in Italy training with world renowned maestro of commedia dell'arte Antonio Fava.

Currently, Fourth Monkey consists of over 100 students, split between the one-year "Year of the Monkey" course, and the "Two Year Rep" course. The company, in partnership with The Stage, offers a full scholarship annually to two prospective students.

Fourth Monkey has collaborated - and created work in association - with theatre companies such as All In Theatre,
Clay & Diamonds,  Complicite, Fevered Sleep, Rhum & Clay, Shunt, The Spanish Theatre Company, Theatre Re, Theatre Témoin, and Told by an Idiot.

The Monkey House
In September 2015 the company announced they had set up their own premises "The Monkey House" on Seven Sisters Road near Finsbury Park where they plan to stay permanently, having previously taught in locations such as Jacksons Lane.

The Monkey House is also a London Fringe performance space, and since 2017 has annually played host to a number of shows for the Camden Fringe.

List of productions and performances

Fourth Monkey has a long history of both audience and critical reviews for their  performances of established texts and company-devised projects.

2019
Camden Fringe Season 2019Two Year Rep production
 Valhalla devised by Fourth Monkey (Camden Fringe)
Fourth Monkey's Cult Season (YOM productions)
 Witness written by Mia Jerome (Camden Fringe)
 909 written by Abi Smith (Camden Fringe)
 Sannyas written by Mia Jerome (Camden Fringe)
Two Year Rep - First Year Devised Show 2019
 RebelRebelRebelRebelRebel. Please? devised by Fourth Monkey in association with Rhum & Clay (The Monkey House)
Fourth Monkey at The Cervantes 2019A showcase of performed excerpts from translations of Spanish and Latin American plays. Performed in association with The Cervantes Theatre, London.
 Yerma by Simon Stone after Federico García Lorca (The Cervantes Theatre, London)
 The Unwritten Law by Felipe Santander (The Cervantes Theatre, London)
 All About My Mother by Samuel Adamson after Pedro Almodóvar (The Cervantes Theatre, London)
 The Little Pony by Paco Bezerra (The Cervantes Theatre, London)
Redemption Season (Two Year Rep Contemporary Season 2019)
 The Love of the Nightingale by Timberlake Wertenbaker (The Monkey House)
 The Lower Depths by Maxim Gorky (The Monkey House)
YOM Devised Season 2019
 Heroes devised by Fourth Monkey (The Monkey House)
 An Open Mind devised by Fourth Monkey (The Monkey House)
Of Land & Sea Season (Two Year Rep Classical Season 2019)
 Henry V by William Shakespeare (The Monkey House)
 Pericles by William Shakespeare (The Monkey House)

2018
Edinburgh & Camden Fringe Seasons 2018
Two Year Rep production:
 The Woman and the Canvas devised by Theatre Re in a co-production with Fourth Monkey.  (Edinburgh Fringe; Camden Fringe)Reworked from their 2017 devised show The Woman on the Chair.
Scandal Season (YOM productions, part of the 2018 Camden Fringe)
 Bombshells performed by graduates of the Year of the Monkey course (Camden Fringe)
 Fatty performed by graduates of the Year of the Monkey course (Camden Fringe)
 Kidnap! performed by graduates of the Year of the Monkey course (Camden Fringe)
Fourth Monkey at The Cervantes 2018A showcase of performed excerpts from new translations of Spanish and Latin American plays. Performed in association with The Cervantes Theatre, London.
 The Opera Cleaners by Ramón Griffero (The Cervantes Theatre, London)
 Divine Words by Ramón del Valle-Inclán (The Cervantes Theatre, London)
 When Five Years Pass by Federico García Lorca (The Cervantes Theatre, London)
 The House of Bernarda Alba by Federico García Lorca (The Cervantes Theatre, London)
Two Year Rep - First Year Devised Show 2018
 The War of the Worlds devised by Fourth Monkey in association with Rhum & Clay, adapted from the novel of the same name by H.G. Wells (The Monkey House)
Season of War (Two Year Rep Contemporary Season 2018)
 Widows by Ariel Dorfman and Tony Kushner (The Monkey House)
 Ghetto by Joshua Sobol (The Monkey House)
YOM Devised Season 2018
 Adrift devised by Fourth Monkey (The Monkey House)
 Faire des Marques (Mark Making) devised by Fourth Monkey (The Monkey House)
Fire & Water Season (Two Year Rep Classical Season 2018)
 Romeo and Juliet by William Shakespeare (The Monkey House)
 The Tempest by William Shakespeare (The Monkey House)

2017
Edinburgh & Camden Fringe Seasons 2017
Two Year Rep productions:
 The Burial of the Rats devised by Fourth Monkey, adapted from the short story of the same name by Bram Stoker (Edinburgh Fringe; Camden Fringe)
 Titus Andronicus by William Shakespeare (Edinburgh Fringe; Camden Fringe)
Fourth Monkey's Women of Greece (YOM productions, part of Edinburgh & Camden Fringe Seasons 2017)  
 Medusa by Ezra Elia (Edinburgh Fringe; Camden Fringe)
 Persephone by Ami Sayers (Edinburgh Fringe; Camden Fringe)
 Pandora by Ami Sayers (Edinburgh Fringe; Camden Fringe)
Orlando: The Queer Element
 Orlando: The Queer Element devised by Clay & Diamonds in association with Fourth Monkey, loosely inspired from Orlando by Virginia Woolf (Hanbury Hall; Knole House)
Two Year Rep - First Year Devised Show 2017
 The Woman on the Chair devised by Fourth Monkey in association with Theatre Re (The Monkey House)Later reworked as their 2018 Edinburgh and Camden Fringe production The Woman & the Canvas.
Conflict Season(Two Year Rep Contemporary Season 2017)
 Mother Courage and Her Children by Bertolt Brecht, translated by John Willett (The Monkey House)
 3 Winters by Tena Štivičić (The Monkey House)
YOM Devised Season 2017
 Goblin Market devised by Fourth Monkey (The Monkey House) 
 Refugee Blues devised by Fourth Monkey (The Monkey House)
Fall of Man Season (Two Year Rep Classical Season 2017)
 The White Devil by John Webster (The Monkey House)
 Julius Caesar by William Shakespeare (The Monkey House)

2016
Fourth Monkey's Genesis and Revelation (Edinburgh Fringe Season 2016)
Two Year Rep productions:
 Ascension: Part II by Steve Green (Edinburgh Fringe)
 Ascension: Part I by Steve Green (Edinburgh Fringe)
YOM productions:
 Sodom by Ami Sayers (Edinburgh Fringe)
 The Ark by Steve Green (Edinburgh Fringe)
 The Whale by Steve Green (Edinburgh Fringe)
The Russian Season (Two Year Rep Contemporary Season 2016)
 Plasticine by Vassily Sigarev, translated by Sasha Dugdale (The Monkey House)
 Terrorism by The Presnyakov brothers, translated by Sarsha Dugdale (The Monkey House)
 The Grain Store by Natalia Vorozhbit, translated by Sasha Dugdale (The Monkey House)
Two Year Rep - First Year Devised Show 2016
 Ruckus (Part I + II) devised by Fourth Monkey in association with Shunt (The Monkey House)
YOM Devised Season 2016
 Question Mark devised by Fourth Monkey (The Monkey House)
 The Nesting Place devised by Fourth Monkey (The Monkey House)
The Revenge Season (Two Year Rep Classical Season 2016)
 The Winter's Tale by William Shakespeare (The Monkey House)
 The Revenger's Tragedy by Thomas Middleton (The Monkey House)

2015
Fourth Monkey's Grimm Tales (Edinburgh Fringe Season 2015)
 Little Red Cap by Ami Sayers (Edinburgh Fringe)
 Hansel & Gretel adapted by Toby Clarke (Edinburgh Fringe)
 The Bloody Countess devised by Fourth Monkey (Edinburgh Fringe)
 Rapunzel adapted by Angela Gasparetto (Edinburgh Fringe)
Transformation Season
 The Odyssey by Hattie Naylor, adapted from the epic poem by Homer (Trinity Buoy Wharf)
 The Wonderful Ice Cream Suit by Ray Bradbury (Trinity Buoy Wharf)
Contemporary Season 2015
 Don Juan Comes Back From The War by Ödön von Horváth, in a new version by Duncan Macmillan (Jacksons Lane)
 The Public by Frederico Garcia Lorca (in association with The Spanish Theatre Company) (Jacksons Lane)
 Hellcats devised by Fourth Monkey in association with Told By An Idiot (Jacksons Lane)
Shakespeare's Comedies Season 
 As You Like It by William Shakespeare (Trinity Buoy Wharf)
 A Midsummer Night’s Dream by William Shakespeare (Trinity Buoy Wharf)
 Much Ado about Nothing by William Shakespeare (Trinity Buoy Wharf)
Tamburlaine The Great
 Tamburlaine the Great: Part II by Christopher Marlowe (Jacksons Lane)
 Tamburlaine the Great: Part I by Christopher Marlowe (Jacksons Lane)

2014
Fourth Monkey Ensemble 2014/15
 The Elephant Man by Steve Green and David Ledger (tour 2014/15)
Edinburgh Fringe Season 2014 
 Alice by Toby Clarke, adapted from the Alice novels by Lewis Carroll ( Edinburgh Fringe Festival)
 Treasure Island adapted from the novel by Robert Louis Stevenson ( Edinburgh Fringe Festival)
 The House of Bernarda Alba by Frederico Garcia Lorca ( Edinburgh Fringe Festival)
 Can't Stay Away! by Mitch Mitchelson, adapted from David Posner's translation of The 22 Misfortunes of Harlequin by Carlo Goldoni ( Edinburgh Fringe Festival)
 The Sad Story of the Sun and the Moon devised by Fourth Monkey ( Edinburgh Fringe Festival)
Greek Season
 Rhesus by Euripides (Trinity Buoy Wharf, London)
 Lysistrata by Aristophanes (Trinity Buoy Wharf, London)
Shizaru Season 
 The Kitchen by Arnold Wesker (Jackson's Lane, London)
 Vinegar Tom by Caryl Churchill (Jackson's Lane, London)
 The Iceman by Toby Clarke, adapted from the short story by Haruki Murakami (Jackson's Lane, London)
Trinity Buoy Wharf Season 2014
 Our Country's Good by Timberlake Wertenbaker (Trinity Buoy Wharf, London)
 Yerma by Frederico Garcia Lorca (Trinity Buoy Wharf, London)
 The Good Person of Szechwan by Bertolt Brecht (Trinity Buoy Wharf, London)
Marlowe Season
 The Jew Of Malta by Christopher Marlowe (in association with Told By An Idiot) (Marlowe Studio, Canterbury, part of Marlowe450)
 The Massacre At Paris by Christopher Marlowe (Canterbury Cathedral crypt, part of Marlowe450)
 Faustus by Christopher Marlowe (Marlowe Studio, Canterbury, part of Marlowe450)

2013
Edinburgh Fringe Season 2013
 The Peculiar Tale of Pablo Picasso and the Mona Lisa by Steve Green (Edinburgh Fringe Festival; The Brockley Jack Studio, London 2014)
 One Flew Over the Cuckoo’s Nest by Dale Wasserman, adapted from the novel of the same name by Ken Kesey (Edinburgh Fringe Festival)
 Sans Salomé by Toby Clarke (Edinburgh Fringe Festival)
Trinity Buoy Wharf Season 2013
 Paradise Lost devised by The Fourth Monkey Ensemble, adapted from the epic poem of the same name by John Milton (Trinity Buoy Wharf, London) 
 Project Colony devised by The Fourth Monkey Ensemble, adapted from In the Penal Colony by Franz Kafka (Trinity Buoy Wharf, London)

2012

Edinburgh Fringe Season 2012
 4.48 Psychosis by Sarah Kane (previously at Theatro Technis, London as part of Spring Rep Season 2012; Edinburgh Fringe Festival)
 The Elephant Man by Steve Green and David Ledger (Edinburgh Fringe Festival)
 Nights at the Circus by Sarah-Jane Moloney and Steve Green, adapted from the novel by Angela Carter (Edinburgh Fringe Festival)
 The Erpingham Camp by Joe Orton (Edinburgh Fringe Festival)
 Divine Words by Ramón del Valle-Inclán (Edinburgh Fringe Festival)
 Minotaur conceived by Natalie Katsou and translated by Yannis Goumas (Edinburgh Fringe Festival)
London Spring Rep Season 2012
 Lord of the Flies by Nigel Williams, adapted from the novel by William Golding (Theatro Technis, London)
 The Bacchae by Euripides, translated by Ranjit Bolt (Theatro Technis, London)

2011

London Rep Season 2011
 Antigone by Sophocles, translated by Ranjit Bolt (Theatro Technis, London)
 The Love of the Nightingale by Timberlake Wertenbaker (Theatro Technis, London)
 The Threepenny Opera by Bertolt Brecht (Theatro Technis, London)

2010
 A Clockwork Orange by Anthony Burgess (Theatro Technis, London; Edinburgh Fringe Festival; Croydon Clocktower 2011)

Awards

References

External links
Fourth Monkey Actor Training Company website
Interview by WestEndWilma with Steve Green about Fourth Monkey's production of The Woman and The Canvas 
Interview by Spotlight with Steve Green about "Alternative Training With Fourth Monkey" 
Article by Susan Elkin on Fourth Monkey
Article by Ink Pellet Magazine on Fourth Monkey and The Monkey House
Goldsmith's University Student's Magazine Q&A with Steve Green on his 2014/15 production of The Elephant Man
Article by Susan Elkin for The Stage "Training providers should ape Fourth Monkey’s innovative approach"
Guest blog by Steve Green for A Younger Theatre on "the joy of the rehearsal rooms"
Extended interview by BroadwayBaby with Steve Green on Fourth Monkey's 2014 Edinburgh Fringe Season
Interview with Fourth Monkey's Charleen Qwaye
Article by Susan Elkin for The Stage "Fourth Monkey business"
Audio interview with Steve Green on Fourth Monkey's 2013 Edinburgh Fringe Season
Audio interview by TheatreVoice with artistic director Steve Green and performers Lauren Young, Abbey Gorton and Euan Forsyth, about Fourth Monkey's production of Project Colony
Article by A Younger Theatre, featuring interviews with artistic director Steve Green and production co-directors Hamish MacDougall and James Yeatman on Fourth Monkey's production of Project Colony site-specific theatre
Interview by Run Riot with Steven Green on Fourth Monkey's production of Project Colony, and Franz Kafka
Interview by This Week London with Steve Green and director Hamish MacDougall on Fourth Monkey's production of Project Colony
Interview by A Younger Theatre with Steve Green
Interview by The New Current with Steve Green on Fourth Monkey's production of 4.48 Psychosis
Article by A Younger Theatre on "Training with the text" at Fourth Monkey, featuring interviews with actress Georgia Kerr and director Hamish MacDougall
Article by Whats On Stage on Fourth Monkey, with interviews and quotes from director Chris Hislop, casting director Kerrie Mailey, and artistic director Steve Green
Article by A Younger Theatre on Fourth Monkey, featuring an interview with artistic director Steve Green

Drama schools in London
Theatre companies in England
Theatre companies in London
Producing house theatres in London
Performing arts education in London